Brigadier-General William Johnston Kirkpatrick  (1852 – 22 November 1931) was a British Army officer.

Military career
Kirkpatrick was commissioned into the Antrim Artillery on 14 December 1872 and transferred to the York and Lancaster Regiment on 28 February 1874. He commanded the 1st Battalion of the York and Lancaster Regiment in the Second Boer War and subsequently commanded Volksrust Sub-district. He became General Officer Commanding Wessex Division in April 1908 before retiring in December 1908.

In retirement he lived at a house known as "Cloon Eavin" at Yateley in Hampshire.

References

1852 births
1931 deaths
British Army brigadiers
Companions of the Order of the Bath
York and Lancaster Regiment officers
British Army personnel of the Second Boer War